Kostopil urban territorial hromada is a hromada located in the Rivne Oblast of Western Ukraine. Its seat of government is the city of Kostopil. The hromada currently covers an area of 653.4 squared kilometers, and has a total population of 44,042 (2022 est.)

Climate 
Kostopil urban hromada has a humid continental warm summer climate (Dfb). It sees the least rainfall in February, with an average precipitation of 42 mm; and the most in July, with 107 mm of average rainfall.

Settlements 
The hromada comprises one city, Kostopil, and the following 29 villages:

 Bryushkiv
 Huta
 Komarivka
 Korchivya
 Kosmachiv
 Ledne
 Maidan
 Maly Midsk
 Maly Stydyn
 Maryanivka

 Mokvynski Khutory
 Oleksandrivka
 Osova
 Penkiv
 Pidluzhne
 Piskiv
 Rokytne
 Rudnya
 Trostyanets
 Tributsy

 Velika Lyubasha
 Velikiy Midsk
 Velikiy Stydyn
 Volitsa
 Yapolot
 Yasnobir
 Zbuzh
 Zhalyn
 Zolotolin

History 
Since the year 1939, this region had been a part of Kostopil Raion. On June 12, 2020, the Government of Ukraine approved Decree No. 722-r, which reformed the administrative divisions of Rivne Oblast. Under this decree, Kostopil Raion was merged into Rivne Raion, and its territory was divided into two territorial hromadas: Holovyn and Kostopil.

References 

2020 establishments in Ukraine
Hromadas of Rivne Oblast